Rodolph Mathias (5 June 1861 – 22 October 1907) was a New Zealand cricketer. He played in six first-class matches for Canterbury from 1888 to 1894.

See also
 List of Canterbury representative cricketers

References

External links
 

1861 births
1907 deaths
New Zealand cricketers
Canterbury cricketers
Cricketers from Christchurch